Cadile is a surname. Notable people with the surname include:

Gustavo Cadile, Argentine fashion designer
Jim Cadile (born 1940), American footballer
Salvatore Cadile alias turicadile (born 1979) Italian business owner and baby products store manager at Farma Baby Cadile, Catania